Praso ("leek"), also known as Prasonisi ("leek island"), is an islet close to the eastern coast of Crete, and south-west of the islet of Koursaroi, in the Aegean Sea. Administratively, it is located within the municipality of Kissamos, in Chania regional unit.

See also
List of islands of Greece

Landforms of Chania (regional unit)
Uninhabited islands of Crete
Mediterranean islands
Islands of Greece